"Happy Birthday" is the tenth single of the Japanese boy group NEWS. It was released on October 1, 2008, in two editions; a regular edition which contains two b-sides: Gan Gan Ganbatte and Push On!, and a limited edition which also contains Happy Birthday and its b-side Gan Gan Ganbatte from the regular edition, as well as another b-side entitled Game of Love and an instrumental version of Happy Birthday. Happy Birthday is NEWS tenth consecutive number-one single since their debut in 2004. This single makes them the second group to have this distinction (the other being KinKi Kids, who currently has twenty-seven consecutive number-one singles).

Overview
Happy Birthday was written and composed by Japanese Hip-hop artist SEAMO. Happy Birthday reached the number-one spot on both the daily and weekly Oricon charts, selling 201,304 copies in its first week; just 38 more copies than their previous single Summer Time, which sold 201,266 copies in its first week.

Promotion
Happy Birthday is the theme song for Kose's Happy Bath Day Precious Rose commercial, which features all six-members.

TV performance
 September 24, 2008 - CDTV 15th Anniversary
 September 29, 2008 - Hey! Hey! Hey! Music Champ
 October 3, 2008 - Music Station

Track list

Charts

Oricon chart

Billboard Japan chart

References

2008 singles
News (band) songs
Oricon Weekly number-one singles
Billboard Japan Hot 100 number-one singles
2008 songs